Crenicichla strigata is a species of cichlid native to the southern tributaries of the Amazon River basin in Brazil and Guyana.

References

strigata
Fish of South America
Fish described in 1862
Taxa named by Albert Günther
Fish of Brazil
Fish of Guyana